"Amado Mio" is a song from the classic 1946 film noir Gilda, written by Doris Fisher and Allan Roberts. The piece was lip-synched by Rita Hayworth and sung by Anita Kert Ellis.
Grace Jones's rendition of the song on her 1989 album Bulletproof Heart was released as a single in a special "Brazilian Mix" in 1990. It became a significant dance hit in the US.

Grace Jones version

In 1989 Grace Jones recorded a version of the song on her album Bulletproof Heart.

A special "Brazilian Mix" of "Amado Mio" was produced by Clivillés and Cole and served as second single of the album, released in 1990. This mix was later available on the 2004 CD re-issue of Bulletproof Heart. The mix charted low on European charts, despite being promoted live on various occasions. In the US, the single was a double A-side with "Crack Attack", and became a significant dance hit.

Track listing
7" single
A. "Amado Mio" (The Brazilian Mix – radio edit) – 3:45
B. "Amado Mio" (LP version – radio edit) – 4:02

12" single
A. "Amado Mio" (The Brazilian Mix) – 6:24
B1. "Amado Mio" (The 28th St. Crew Club Mix) – 6:16
B2. "Amado Mio" (The 28th St. Crew Dub Mix) – 7:08

US 12" single
A1. "Amado Mio" (The Brazilian Mix) – 6:23
A2. "Amado Mio" (The 28th St. Crew Dub Mix) – 7:08
B1. "Crack Attack" (The Don't Do It Mix) – 6:16
B2. "Crack Attack" (LP version) – 5:20

CD single
 "Amado Mio" (The Brazilian Mix) – 6:24
 "Amado Mio" (The 28th St. Crew Club Mix) – 6:16
 "Amado Mio" (The 28th St. Crew Dub Mix) – 7:08

Chart performance

Other cover versions 
 In the 1940s the song was recorded several times such as by Dick Haymes (released in June 1946), Italian singer Natalino Otto (1947 in Italian) and Czech singer Jiřina Salačová (1947). 

In 1989, the song was recorded by the famous Spanish actress and singer Sara Montiel.

 Pink Martini covered the song on their 1997 album Sympathique.  This version was used in the Mexican movie Y Tu Mama Tambien and the 2021 Netflix movie Red Notice.
 Finnish singer Ilkka "Danny" Lipsanen also covered the song.
 Kurdish singer Homer Dzayi also covered the song in 2019 under the title Layla Paul Malak.
 Hungarian singers Katalin Karády and Márta Záray also covered the song, with a romantic, but very different lyrics.

In media
In episode 4 of season 4 of the Netflix Money Heist television series, the song is played by Pink Martini.

References

1946 songs
1989 singles
Grace Jones songs
Songs written for films
Songs written by Doris Fisher (songwriter)
Songs written by Allan Roberts (songwriter)
House music songs